Monroe Street East Historic District is a national historic district located at Wheeling, Ohio County, West Virginia. The district encompasses six contributing buildings.  They are a Greek Revival style church built in 1837, a Roman-Tuscan style dwelling dated to 1852 and known as the Paxton-Reed House, and an eclectic 1881 dwelling. Also in the district is a Richardsonian Romanesque style apartment building (c. 1892) and a set of vernacular post-American Civil War townhouses.

It was listed on the National Register of Historic Places in 1980.  In 1999, the district was encompassed by the East Wheeling Historic District.

References

External links

National Register of Historic Places in Wheeling, West Virginia
Greek Revival church buildings in West Virginia
Romanesque Revival architecture in West Virginia
Historic districts in Wheeling, West Virginia
Historic American Buildings Survey in West Virginia
Historic districts on the National Register of Historic Places in West Virginia